DeKalb High School is a public high school located in DeKalb, Texas, United States. It is the sole high school in the DeKalb Independent School District and is classified as a 3A school by the University Interscholastic League (UIL). In 2015, the school was rated "Met Standard" by the Texas Education Agency.

Athletics
The DeKalb Mighty Bears compete in the following sports:

Baseball
Basketball
Cross Country
Football
Golf
Powerlifting
Softball
Tennis
Track and Field
Volleyball

References

External links
 Official website

Schools in Bowie County, Texas
Public high schools in Texas